Syllepte kayei is a moth in the family Crambidae. It was described by A. Klima in 1939. It is found in Trinidad.

References

Moths described in 1939
kayei
Moths of the Caribbean